The LCDR B1 class was a class of 0-6-0 steam locomotives of the London, Chatham and Dover Railway. The class was designed by William Kirtley and introduced in 1877.

Ownership changes
The locomotives passed to the South Eastern and Chatham Railway in 1899. Two (LCDR nos. 612 and 613) survived into Southern Railway ownership in 1923. All had been withdrawn by 1924.

References

B1
0-6-0 locomotives
Railway locomotives introduced in 1877
Scrapped locomotives
Standard gauge steam locomotives of Great Britain